The  Dallas Cowboys season was the franchise's 26th season in the National Football League. The Cowboys improved on their 9-7 record from 1984 and made the playoffs after a one-year absence. This marked the final postseason appearance for the Cowboys under Tom Landry and Bum Bright, where they were shutout in the divisional playoff game to the Los Angeles Rams. The team holds the record for consecutive winning seasons with 20.

Summary 

Tom Landry's team got off to a fast start, opening the season with 44-14 trouncing of their longtime nemesis, the Redskins, and later defeating the Steelers (their first victory over Pittsburgh since 1972) to give the team a 5–1 record and an early two-game lead over the rest of the division. However, the team was up and down the rest of the way, finishing out the season 5–5 and allowing both the Giants and Redskins to catch up with them at 10–6. Two wins each over both the Giants and Redskins allowed the Cowboys to win the division based on the tie-breaking rules. During the inconsistent stretch toward the end of the season, the Cowboys suffered two of the most embarrassing defeats in team history. On November 17, the undefeated Chicago Bears came to Texas Stadium and gave the Cowboys a 44–0 beating that was the worst loss in team history, and it was also the first time in 218 games that the Cowboys had not scored. Three weeks later the team traveled to Cincinnati, where the Bengals handed them a 50–24 loss, piling up 570 yards in the process, the most yards the Cowboys had given up in team history. The Cowboys proved to be a resilient bunch however, winning a crucial game at home against the Giants the following week that gave them their first division title since 1981, and the final for Tom Landry. That game would prove to be the last highlight of the season, as the team was shut out in the playoffs for the first time in team history, 20–0, by the Rams in Anaheim, California, which would prove to be the final playoff appearance for the Cowboys under Landry.

With the previous season's quarterback controversy behind him, Danny White led the Cowboys' passing game to number three overall in the league. Wide receiver Tony Hill posted career highs in receptions and receiving yards, and Mike Renfro blossomed in his second season with the Cowboys. Tight end Doug Cosbie had another Pro Bowl season. Turnovers proved to be a problem though, as White and backup quarterback Gary Hogeboom combined to throw 24 interceptions. Running back Tony Dorsett was the only reliable ball carrier on the roster, rushing for 1,307 yards on the season, and going over 10,000 yards for his career. On the defensive side of the ball, the Cowboys registered 62 sacks and 33 interceptions, with cornerback Everson Walls becoming the first player to ever lead the league in interceptions three times, with nine. The big plays covered up a pass defense that ranked 27th in the league, and a defense that ranked 23rd overall. The secondary allowed big plays through the air throughout the season, and the defense allowed running back Eric Dickerson to rush for a playoff record 248 yards in their playoff game against the Rams.

NFL Draft

Personnel

Staff

Roster

Regular season

Schedule

Division opponents are in bold text

Game summaries

Week 1: vs. Washington Redskins

Source: Pro-Football-Reference.com

Week 5

Week 6: vs. Pittsburgh Steelers

Week 15: vs. New York Giants

Standings

Playoffs

Divisional playoffs

January 4, 1986

NFC: Los Angeles Rams 20, Dallas Cowboys 0

Awards
 The Cowboys sent four players to the Pro Bowl following the 1985 season. Wide receiver Tony Hill went to his first since 1979, tight end Doug Cosbie was named to his third consecutive game, cornerback Everson Walls achieved his fourth, and defensive tackle Randy White was named to his ninth consecutive pro bowl. Randy White was named to the associated press All-NFL first team, while Everson Walls was named to the second team.
Everson Walls, NFL Leader, Interceptions, (9)

Publications
 The Football Encyclopedia 
 Total Football 
 Cowboys Have Always Been My Heroes

References

External links
 1985 Dallas Cowboys
 Pro Football Hall of Fame
 Dallas Cowboys Official Site

Dallas Cowboys seasons
Dallas
NFC East championship seasons
Dallas